Claudiu Baştea (born 18 March 1979 in Sibiu) is a Romanian judoka.

Achievements

References

External links
 
 
 

1979 births
Living people
Sportspeople from Sibiu
Romanian male judoka
Judoka at the 2000 Summer Olympics
Judoka at the 2004 Summer Olympics
Olympic judoka of Romania